Tsou Hsin-ni (born 11 January 1995) is a Taiwanese footballer who plays as a midfielder. She has been a member of the Chinese Taipei women's national team.

International career
Tsou Hsin-ni capped for Chinese Taipei at senior level during the 2017 EAFF E-1 Football Championship and the 2018 AFC Women's Asian Cup qualification.

References

1995 births
Living people
Taiwanese women's footballers
Women's association football midfielders
Chinese Taipei women's international footballers